Hydrophorus balticus  is a species of fly in the family of Dolichopodidae.

References

Insects described in 1824
balticus
Taxa named by Johann Wilhelm Meigen